Gwoja is an electoral division of the Northern Territory Legislative Assembly in Australia. It was created in a 2019 redistribution for the 2020 general election, replacing the electoral division of Stuart.

The division is named after Gwoya Tjungurrayi, a Walpiri-Anmatyerre man who survived the Coniston massacre in 1928, and was depicted on an Australian postage stamp. His likeness was also the inspiration for the Aboriginal elder depicted on the reverse of the Australian two-dollar coin.

When the seat was first contested in 2020, the seat was won by incumbent Namatjira Labor MLA Chansey Paech, who transferred here after his seat was made a notional CLP seat in a redistribution.

Members for Gwoja

Election results

References

External links
Division Profile: Division of Gwoja

Electoral divisions of the Northern Territory
2020 establishments in Australia
Constituencies established in 2020